This article shows the rosters of all participating teams at the 2022 FIVB Volleyball Women's Challenger Cup in Zadar.

Rosters

The following is the Belgian roster in the 2022 Challenger Cup.

Head coach: Gert Vande Broek

The following is the Belgian roster in the 2022 Challenger Cup.

Head coach: Ferhat Akbaş

References

External links
 Official website

FIVB Volleyball Women's Challenger Cup
FIVB